This article is a catalog of actresses and models who have appeared on V magazine, starting with the magazine's first issue in September 1999.

1999

2000

2001

2002

2003

2004

2005

2006

2007

2008

2009

2010

2011

2012

2013

2014

2015

2016

2017

2018

2019

2020

2021

2022

External links
  V Magazine
  Models V Magazine

V
V